Geosporobacter ferrireducens is a heterotrophic, iron-reducing, alkaliphilic and anaerobic bacterium from the genus of Geosporobacter which has been isolated from oil-contaminated soil from Korea.

References

Clostridiaceae
Bacteria described in 2015
Bacillota